Mount Annaguan (Malaueg language: Ga-dang ya Annaguan) is a mountain located in the town of Rizal in the province of Cagayan. The mountain contains a very well preserved forest and also a cave for tourism. It also contains some rare animal species of the Philippines like the Philippine eagle. At the peak of the mountain there is also a view of the whole town of Rizal, Conner, Santo Niño and Piat. The mountain served as a hiding place for Japanese soldiers during World War II.

Location
The mountain sits right beneath a barangay of Annaguan, where its name originated. Location of the original way to the mountain is not yet defined and it will take a half day to climb from the foot to the peak.

References

Annaguan
Landforms of Cagayan